The 2008 William Jones Cup was the 30th tournament of the William Jones Cup that took place in Taipei from 10 July – 24 July.

Men's tournament

Preliminary round

Knockout stage

Championship Round

5-8th Classification Round

Final standings

Women's tournament

Preliminary round

Final round

Final standings

References 

 Results of July 10
 Results of July 10
 Results of July 11
 Results of July 11
 Results of July 12
 Results of July 12
 Results of July 13
 Results of July 13
 Result of July 14 (Qatar vs Korea)
 Result of July 14 (All matches)
 Result of July 15 (Jordan vs Korea)
 Result of July 15 (All matches)
 Results of July 16 (Korea vs Australia U-19 and standings)
 Results of July 16 (All matches)
Women's teams rosters
Women's Day 1 (July 19 or 20 results)}
Women's Day 1 (Taiwan vs Woori Bank result)
Game stats
Women's Day 2 (Australia U-19 vs Woori Bank article)
Women's Day 2 (July 21) results
Women's Day 3 (Woori Bank vs Malaysia article)
Women's Day 3 (July 22) and semifinals (Jul 23) results
Women's final and 3rd-place match (Jul 24 or 25) results
All results
Wiki Basketball (in Chinese)

2009
2009 in Taiwanese sport
2009–10 in Asian basketball
William Jones Cup